Jerome A. Gilbert is a biomedical engineer and university administrator. He was the president of Marshall University in Huntington, West Virginia.

Early life and education
Gilbert was born in Mississippi and received his bachelor's degree from Mississippi State University.  He then received his Ph.D. in biomedical engineering from Duke University.

Academic appointments
Gilbert was previously a graduate assistant at Duke, and later held academic appointments at North Carolina State University and the University of North Carolina Medical School.  In 1988 he joined the faculty of Mississippi State, and was made a full professor in 1993.  He also held a position at the University of Mississippi Medical Center.  In 2010 he became provost of Mississippi State.  He was appointed President of Marshall University in 2016 following the sudden death of Dr. Stephen Kopp.   He is a member of the College of Fellows of the American Institute for Medical and Biological Engineering and of the Fellows of the Institute of Biological Engineering.

References

Living people
People from Mississippi
Mississippi State University alumni
Duke University Pratt School of Engineering alumni
Presidents of Marshall University
Year of birth missing (living people)